Pseudocordylus subviridis, also known as the Drakensberg crag lizard, is a species of lizard in the family Cordylidae. It is a small lizard found in South Africa and Lesotho.

References

Pseudocordylus
Reptiles of Lesotho
Reptiles of South Africa
Reptiles described in 1838
Taxa named by Andrew Smith (zoologist)